The Seikan Tunnel (or) is a  dual-gauge railway tunnel in Japan, with a  portion under the seabed of the Tsugaru Strait, which separates Aomori Prefecture on the main Japanese island of Honshu from the northern island of Hokkaido. The tunnel is part of the standard-gauge Hokkaido Shinkansen and the narrow-gauge Kaikyō Line of the Hokkaido Railway Company (JR Hokkaido)'s Tsugaru-Kaikyō Line.

The Seikan Tunnel is the world's longest undersea tunnel by overall length (the Channel Tunnel, while shorter, has a longer undersea segment). It is also the second-deepest transport tunnel below the sea level after the Ryfylke Tunnel, a road tunnel in Norway which opened in 2019, and the second longest main-line railway tunnel after the Gotthard Base Tunnel in Switzerland, opened in 2016.

History

Connecting the islands Honshu and Hokkaido by a fixed link had been considered since the Taishō period (1912–25), but serious surveying commenced only in 1946, induced by the loss of overseas territory at the end of World War II and the need to accommodate returnees. In 1954, five ferries, including the Tōya Maru, sank in the Tsugaru Strait during a typhoon, killing 1,430 passengers. The following year, Japanese National Railways (JNR) expedited the tunnel feasibility study. Also of concern was the increasing traffic between the two islands. A booming economy saw traffic levels on the JNR-operated Seikan Ferry double to 4,040,000 passengers/year from 1955 to 1965, and cargo levels rose 1.7 times to 6,240,000 tonnes/year. Inter-island traffic forecast projections made in 1971 predicted increasing growth that would eventually outstrip the ability of the ferry pier facility, which was constrained by geographical conditions.

In September 1971, the decision was made to commence work on the tunnel. A Shinkansen-capable cross section was selected, with plans to extend the Shinkansen network. Arduous construction in difficult geological conditions proceeded. Thirty-four workers were killed during construction. On 27 January 1983, Japanese Prime Minister Yasuhiro Nakasone pressed a switch that set off a blast that completed the pilot tunnel. Similarly on 10 March 1985, Minister of Transport Tokuo Yamashita symbolically bored through the main tunnel.

The necessity for the project was questioned at times during construction, as the 1971 traffic predictions were overestimates. Instead of the traffic rate increasing as predicted to a peak in 1985, it peaked earlier in 1978 and then proceeded to decrease. The decrease was attributed to the slowdown in Japan's economy since the first oil crisis in 1973 and to advances made in air transport facilities and longer-range sea transport.

The tunnel was opened on 13 March 1988, having cost a total of ¥1.1 trillion (US$7 billion) to construct, almost 12 times the original budget, much of which was due to inflation over the years. To commemorate the event, a commemorative 500 yen coin depicting the tunnel was issued by the Japan Mint in 1988. Once the tunnel was completed, all railway transport between Honshu and Hokkaido used it. However, for passenger transport, 90% of people use air travel due to the speed and cost. For example, to travel between Tokyo and Sapporo by train takes eight hours (Tokyo station and Shin-Sapporo station), with transfer from Shinkansen to narrow-gauge express train at Hakodate. By air, the journey is 1 hour and 45 minutes, or three hours and thirty minutes including airport access times. Deregulation and competition in Japanese domestic air travel has brought down prices on the Tokyo-Sapporo route, making rail more expensive in comparison.

The Hokutosei overnight train service began after the completion of the Seikan Tunnel; a later and more luxurious Cassiopeia overnight train service was often fully booked. Both were withdrawn following the commencement of Hokkaido Shinkansen services (in August 2015 and March 2016 respectively), with freight trains being the only regular service utilising the narrow gauge line since that time.  JR Hokkaido is exploring the use of "Train on Train" technology to remove the threat that the shock wave created in front of Shinkansen trains traveling at full speed pose to freight trains operating on Japanese standard narrow-gauge track in a tunnel setting.  If successful, it will allow the Hokkaido Shinkansen to travel at full speed inside the tunnel in the future.

It was expected that by 2018 one daily service will be run at  through the tunnel. In March 2019, a  speed limit inside the tunnel allowed Tokyo-Shin-Hakodate services in 3h58. The final stage is proposed to open to Sapporo Station in 2031 and is expected to shorten the Tokyo-Sapporo rail journey to five hours. The Hokkaido Shinkansen will be operated by JR Hokkaido.

Construction timeline
 24 April 1946: Geological surveying begins.
 26 September 1954: The train ferry Tōya Maru sinks in the Tsugaru Strait.
 23 March 1964: Japan Railway Construction Public Corporation is established.
 28 September 1971: Construction on the main tunnel begins.
 27 January 1983: Pilot tunnel breakthrough.
 10 March 1985: Main tunnel breakthrough.
 13 March 1988: The tunnel opens.
 26 March 2016: Shinkansen services commence operation through the tunnel, regular narrow gauge passenger services through the tunnel cease.

Surveying, construction and geology

Surveying started in 1946 and construction began in 1971. By August 1982, less than 700 metres of the tunnel remained to be excavated. First contact between the two sides was in 1983. The western neck was selected, with its conditions considered favourable for tunnelling.

The geology of the undersea portion of the tunnel consists of volcanic rock, pyroclastic rock, as well as sedimentary rock of the Neogene period. The area is folded into a nearly vertical syncline, which means that the youngest rock is in the centre of the strait and encountered last. Divided roughly into thirds, the Honshū side consists of volcanic rocks (notably andesite and basalt); the Hokkaido side consists of sedimentary rocks (notably Tertiary period tuff and mudstone); and the centre portion consists of Kuromatsunai strata (Tertiary period sand-like mudstone). Igneous intrusions and faults caused crushing of the rock and complicated the tunnelling procedures.

Initial geological investigation occurred from 1946 to 1963, which involved drilling the sea-bed, sonic surveys, submarine boring, observations using a mini-submarine, as well as seismic and magnetic surveys. To establish a greater understanding, a horizontal pilot boring was undertaken along the line of the service and main tunnels. Tunnelling occurred simultaneously from the northern end and the southern. The dry land portions were tackled with traditional mountain tunnelling techniques, with a single main tunnel. However, for the  undersea portion, three bores were excavated with increasing diameters respectively: an initial pilot tunnel, a service tunnel, and finally the main tunnel. The service tunnel was periodically connected to the main tunnel with a series of connecting drifts, at  intervals. The pilot tunnel serves as the service tunnel for the central five-kilometre portion. Beneath the Tsugaru Strait, the use of a tunnel boring machine (TBM) was abandoned after less than two kilometres owing to the variable nature of the rock and difficulty in accessing the face for advanced grouting. Blasting with dynamite and mechanical picking were then used to excavate.

Maintenance
A 2002 report by Michitsugu Ikuma described, for the undersea section, that "the tunnel structure appears to remain in a good condition." The amount of inflow has been decreasing with time, although it "increases right after a large earthquake".
In March 2018 at 30 years of age, maintenance costs amounted to 30 billion Yen or US$286 million since 1999. Plans are to increase speed and provide mobile communication at the full track.

Structure
Initially, only  narrow-gauge track was laid through the tunnel, but in 2005 the Hokkaido Shinkansen project started construction which included laying dual gauge track (providing standard gauge track capability) and extending the Shinkansen network through the tunnel. Shinkansen services to Hakodate commenced in March 2016, and are proposed to be extended to Sapporo by 2031. The tunnel has  of continuous welded rail.

Two stations are within the tunnel—Tappi-Kaitei Station and Yoshioka-Kaitei Station. They serve as emergency escape points. In the event of a fire or other disaster, the stations provide the equivalent safety of a much shorter tunnel. The effectiveness of the escape shafts at the emergency stations is enhanced by having exhaust fans to extract smoke, television cameras to help route passengers to safety, thermal (infrared) fire alarm systems, and water spray nozzles. Before the construction of the Hokkaido Shinkansen, both stations contained museums detailing the history and function of the tunnel that could be visited on special sightseeing tours. The museums are now closed and the space provides storage for work on the Hokkaido Shinkansen. The two were the first railway stations in the world built under the sea.

See also
 Seikan Tunnel Tappi Shakō Line
 Train on Train, an experimental concept for conveying freight at higher speeds through the tunnel
 JR Freight Class EH800, AC freight locomotives used to haul trains through the Seikan Tunnel
 Sakhalin–Hokkaido Tunnel
 Bohai Strait tunnel

References

External links

 The Seikan Tunnel, Aomori Prefecture Government, version of 3 May 2006 at the Internet Archive

 
Coastal construction
Railway tunnels in Japan
Tunnels completed in 1988
Undersea tunnels in Asia
Hokkaido Shinkansen
1988 establishments in Japan